James A. Thorpe (January 10, 1944 – July 1, 2020) was an American-born Canadian football player who played for the Toronto Argonauts and Winnipeg Blue Bombers. He previously played football at Hofstra University.

References

1944 births
2020 deaths
People from Manhasset, New York
Sportspeople from Nassau County, New York
Players of American football from New York (state)
Hofstra Pride football players
Toronto Argonauts players
Winnipeg Blue Bombers players
American players of Canadian football
Canadian football wide receivers